Ernestas Deringas (born 1899, date of death unknown) was a Lithuanian footballer. He played in one match for the Lithuania national football team in 1923. He was also part of Lithuania's squad for the football tournament at the 1924 Summer Olympics, but he did not play in any matches.

References

External links
 

1899 births
Year of death missing
Lithuanian footballers
Lithuania international footballers
Place of birth missing
Association football defenders
Olympic footballers of Lithuania
Footballers at the 1924 Summer Olympics